This is a list of the main career statistics of Russian professional tennis player Elena Vesnina.

Performance timelines

Only main-draw results in WTA Tour, Grand Slam tournaments, Fed Cup/Billie Jean King Cup and Olympic Games are included in win–loss records.

Singles

Notes
 The first Premier 5 event of the year has switched back and forth between the Dubai Tennis Championships and the Qatar Total Open since 2009. Dubai was classified as a Premier 5 event from 2009 to 2011 before being succeeded by Doha for the 2012–2014 period. In 2015, Dubai regained its Premier 5 status while Doha was demoted to Premier status. The two tournaments have since alternated status every year.
 In 2014, the Toray Pan Pacific Open was downgraded to a Premier event and replaced by the Wuhan Open.

Doubles

Notes
 The first Premier 5 event of the year has switched back and forth between the Dubai Tennis Championships and the Qatar Total Open since 2009. Dubai was classified as a Premier 5 event from 2009 to 2011 before being succeeded by Doha for the 2012–2014 period. In 2015, Dubai regained its Premier 5 status while Doha was demoted to Premier status. The two tournaments have since alternated status every year.
 In 2014, the Toray Pan Pacific Open was downgraded to a Premier event and replaced by the Wuhan Open.

Mixed doubles

Grand Slam finals

Women's doubles: 11 (3 titles, 8 runner-ups)

Mixed doubles: 5 (1 title, 4 runner-ups)

Other significant finals

Olympic finals

Doubles: 2 (1 gold medal)

Mixed doubles: 1 (silver medal)

Year-end championships

Doubles: 2 (1 title, 1 runner–up)

WTA 1000 tournaments / Premier Mandatory / Premier 5 / Tier I

Singles: 1 (title)

Doubles: 17 (8 titles, 9 runner-ups)

WTA career finals

Singles: 10 (3 titles, 7 runner-ups)

Doubles: 44 (18 titles, 26 runner-ups)

ITF Circuit finals

Singles: 6 (2 titles, 4 runner–ups)

Doubles: 6 (6 titles)

WTA Tour career earnings
As of 31 May 2021

Fed Cup participation 
This table is current through the 2017 Fed Cup

Singles (3–3)

Doubles (10–5)

Record against top-10 players
Vesnina's match record against players who have been ranked in the top 10 with those who have been No. 1 in boldface

  Roberta Vinci 5–3
  Venus Williams 4–3
  Li Na 3–1
  Dominika Cibulková 4–3
  Andrea Petkovic 3–3
  Eugenie Bouchard 2–0
  Kimiko Date-Krumm 2–0
  Lucie Šafářová 2–0
  Patty Schnyder 2–0
  Svetlana Kuznetsova 2–1
  Francesca Schiavone 2–1
  Ana Ivanovic 2–2
  Elina Svitolina 2–2
  Samantha Stosur 2–3
  Marion Bartoli 2–4
  Flavia Pennetta 2–4
  Caroline Wozniacki 2–6
  Ekaterina Makarova 2–7
  Belinda Bencic 1–0
  Sara Errani 1–1
  Daniela Hantuchová 1–1
  Simona Halep 1–1
  Amélie Mauresmo 1–1
  Timea Bacsinszky 1–2
  Maria Sharapova 1–2
  Angelique Kerber 1–3
  Anna Chakvetadze 1–5
  Agnieszka Radwańska 1–5
  Vera Zvonareva 1–6
  Jelena Janković 1–7
  Mary Pierce 0–1
  Dinara Safina 0–1
  Carla Suárez Navarro 0–1
  Nadia Petrova 0–2
  Elena Dementieva 0–3
  Justine Henin 0–3
  Maria Kirilenko 0–4
  Serena Williams 0–5
  Victoria Azarenka 0–8

Wins over top-10 opponents

Singles

Doubles

External links

References

Vesnina, Elena